Trans Europ Express is a former international train network in Europe.

It may also refer to:

Trans-Europ-Express (film), a 1966 film written and directed by Alain Robbe-Grillet 
Trans-Europe Express (album), by Kraftwerk
"Trans-Europe Express" (song), the album's title track

See also

 Trans-Euro Express (play), a stageplay by Gary Duggan
Transeuropa (disambiguation)

Tee (disambiguation)